Vidhyawati Vidyashankar  was an Indian politician from the state of the Madhya Pradesh.
She represented Chhindwara Vidhan Sabha constituency of undivided Madhya Pradesh Legislative Assembly by winning General election of 1957.

References 

Madhya Pradesh MLAs 1957–1962
People from Chhindwara
Year of birth missing
Year of death missing
20th-century Indian women politicians
20th-century Indian politicians
Indian National Congress politicians from Madhya Pradesh
Women members of the Madhya Pradesh Legislative Assembly